The third season of the television series Buffy the Vampire Slayer premiered on September 29, 1998  on The WB and episode 22, the second of the two part season finale, aired on July 13, 1999. However, episode 18 "Earshot" did not air until September 21, 1999, shortly before the season 4 premiere. The show maintained its previous time slot, airing Tuesdays at 8:00 pm ET. "Earshot" and "Graduation Day, Part Two", were delayed in the wake of the Columbine High School massacre because of their content.

Plot
After attempting to start a new life in Los Angeles, Buffy Summers (Sarah Michelle Gellar) returns to Sunnydale in season three, and is reunited with her friends and her mother. She is no longer a criminal suspect, but Principal Snyder, who took vindictive pleasure in expelling Buffy, refuses to reinstate her until he is told to do so by Giles. Angel (David Boreanaz) is resurrected mysteriously by the unseen Powers That Be. While Buffy is happy to have Angel back, he seems to have lost much of his sanity in Hell. Buffy helps Angel recover but, having seen Angel's demonic side, Buffy's friends distrust him until he saves them from a monster.

Rupert Giles (Anthony Stewart Head) is fired from the Watchers' Council because he has developed a "father's love" for Buffy, and towards the end of the season Buffy announces that she will also no longer work for the Council. Early in the season she is confronted with an unstable Slayer, Faith (Eliza Dushku), who was activated after Kendra's death near the end of season two.

Angel, after getting his soul back, is once again tormented by his guilt and personally by an entity called the First Evil, who takes credits of bringing Angel back for wicked intents and goads him into attempting suicide. Though Buffy is unable to prevent Angel from killing himself, the Powers That Be intervene and convince Angel that he has a greater purpose.  

Although the First is still out there, the antagonist of the season is shown to be the affable Mayor Richard Wilkins III (Harry Groener), who is near completion of his plan to "ascend" to become a giant snake-like demon – having already gained immortality through a Faustian bargain with demons when he founded Sunnydale a century ago.  The final step is to be a massacre of students on Sunnydale High's graduation day.

Although Faith works with Buffy at first, after accidentally killing a human, Faith becomes irrational and sides with Mayor Wilkins, whose charismatic behavior influences Faith's dark side. She helps Wilkins in his plan, and eventually she poisons Angel. The only antidote for the poison is the blood of a Slayer, so Buffy tries to grab Faith to feed her to Angel.  Faith, though severely wounded, jumps from her roof onto a passing truck, out of Buffy's reach. Buffy is forced to let Angel drink from her, putting her in a brief coma. Wilkins, who had a fatherly affection for Faith, gets angry and attempts to suffocate her, but is stopped by Angel. During her time in a coma, Buffy shares a dream with Faith where they make peace.

At the climax of the season, Wilkins speaks at the graduation ceremony, as the time for his transformation has come and he finally morphs into the demon Olvikan. He eats Principal Snyder and kills several others; but Buffy and her friends have organized the graduating students to fight back against Wilkins and his vampires. (A solar eclipse allows Angel and other vampires to be out in daytime.) Buffy confronts the demon, taunting him about Faith. She lures the provoked Mayor into the library which has many explosives. The explosion destroys Wilkins in his Olvikan form, as well as the school.

Meanwhile, Angel becomes convinced that Buffy's love for him will be bad for her in the long run. After the battle with the Mayor, he leaves Sunnydale, leading to the spin-off series in Los Angeles. Cordelia also leaves Sunnydale at the end of the season in order to attempt an acting career in L.A., though later becomes a major character on the spin-off.

Cast and characters

Main cast 
 Sarah Michelle Gellar as Buffy Summers
 Nicholas Brendon as Xander Harris
 Alyson Hannigan as Willow Rosenberg
 Charisma Carpenter as Cordelia Chase
 David Boreanaz as Angel
 Seth Green as Daniel "Oz" Osbourne
 Anthony Stewart Head as Rupert Giles

Recurring cast

Guest cast 
 Elizabeth Anne Allen as Amy Madison
 Robia LaMorte as The First Evil/Jenny Calendar
 Julia Lee as Lily
 James Marsters as Spike
 Mark Metcalf as The Master
 Robin Sachs as Ethan Rayne
 Andy Umberger as D'Hoffryn
 Harris Yulin as Quentin Travers

Crew 
Series creator Joss Whedon served as executive producer and showrunner, and wrote and directed five episodes of the season including the season premiere and the two-part finale. David Greenwalt was promoted to executive producer, and wrote two episodes (including directing one of them) and directed another. Marti Noxon was promoted to co-producer and wrote five episodes. New additions in the third season included Jane Espenson, who served as executive story editor and wrote three episodes, including an episode originally pitched from Thania St. John (who receives story credit). Douglas Petrie joined as a story editor, later promoted to executive story editor midseason and wrote three episodes. Dan Vebber joined as a staff writer and wrote two episodes. David Fury returned and freelanced two episodes. This was the last season for Greenwalt as a writer/director on the series, as he departed to be the showrunner for the spin off series Angel. He would serve as consulting producer until the end of the sixth season.

Joss Whedon directed the highest number of episodes in the third season, directing five episodes. James A. Contner and James Whitmore, Jr. each directed four.

Episodes

Reception 
Rotten Tomatoes reported an approval rating of 100% with an average score of 8.75/10, based on 12 reviews. The website's critics consensus reads, "Season three perfects the show's winning formula to create an addictive and satisfying viewing experience, episode after episode."

The series received two Primetime Emmy Award nominations, for Outstanding Makeup for a Series for "The Zeppo" and Outstanding Sound Editing for a Series for "Lovers Walk".

The third season averaged 5.3 million viewers, which was its highest rated season.

DVD release 
Buffy the Vampire Slayer: The Complete Third Season was released on DVD in region 1 on January 7, 2003 and in region 2 on October 29, 2001. The DVD includes all 22 episodes on 6 discs presented in full frame 1.33:1 aspect ratio. Special features on the DVD include four commentary tracks—"Helpless" by writer David Fury, "Bad Girls" by writer Doug Petrie, "Consequences" by director Michael Gershman and "Earshot" by writer Jane Espenson. Writers Joss Whedon, Jane Espenson, and Doug Petrie discuss the episodes "Bad Girls", "Consequences", "Enemies", "Earshot", and "Graduation Day, Part One" in interviews. Scripts for "Faith, Hope & Trick", "Band Candy", "Lovers Walk", and "The Wish" are included. Featurettes include, "Special Effects", "Wardrobe", "Weapons", which all detail the title subjects; "Buffy Speak", which details the language and dialogue used on the show; and "Season 3 Overview", a 20-minute featurette where cast and crew members discuss the season. Also included are cast biographies and photo galleries.

References

External links 
 
 List of Buffy the Vampire Slayer season 3 episodes at BuffyGuide.com
 

 0
1998 American television seasons
1999 American television seasons